This is a list of prominent individuals and organizations who formally endorsed or voiced support for Hillary Clinton as the Democratic Party's presidential nominee for the 2008 U.S. presidential election.

U.S. Presidents and Vice Presidents
 Fmr. President Bill Clinton
 Fmr. Vice-President Walter Mondale

Senators
 Sen. Evan Bayh (D-IN) 
Sen. Blanche Lincoln (D-AR)
 Sen. Maria Cantwell (D-WA) 
 Sen. Dianne Feinstein (D-CA), Chairwoman of the Rules and Administration Committee 
Sen. Daniel Inouye (D-HI), Chairman of the Commerce, Science and Transportation Committee
 Sen. Tim Johnson (D-SD)
 Sen. Robert Menendez (D-NJ) 
 Sen. Barbara Mikulski (D-MD) 
 Sen. Patty Murray (D-WA) 
 Sen. Bill Nelson (D-FL) 
 Sen. Mark Pryor (D-AR) 
 Sen. Chuck Schumer (D-NY) 
 Sen. Debbie Stabenow (D-MI) 
 Sen. Sheldon Whitehouse (D-RI) 
 Fmr. Sen. John Breaux (D-LA) 
 Fmr. Sen. John Glenn (D-OH), former NASA astronaut, 1984 Presidential candidate 
 Fmr. Sen. Dee Huddleston (D-KY) 
 Fmr. Sen. Robert Burren Morgan (D-NC) 
 Fmr. Sen. Claiborne Pell (D-RI) 
 Fmr. Sen. Robert Torricelli (D-NJ)

U.S. Representatives
 Rep. Steve Israel (D-NY)
 Rep. Jay Inslee (D-WA)
 Rep. Darlene Hooley (D-OR)
 Rep. Ruben Hinojosa (D-TX)
 Rep. Maurice Hinchey (D-NY)
 Rep. Brian Higgins (D-NY)
 Rep. Alcee Hastings (D-FL)
 Rep. John Hall (D-NY)
 Rep. Kirsten Gillibrand (D-NY)
 Rep. Eliot Engel (D-NY)
 Rep. John Dingell (D-MI)
 Rep. Norm Dicks (D-WA)
 Rep. Diana DeGette (D-CO)
 Rep. Henry Cuellar (D-TX)
 Rep. Joe Crowley (D-NY)
 Rep. Carolyn Maloney (D-NY)
 Rep. Carolyn McCarthy (D-NY)
 Rep. Michael McNulty (D-NY)
 Rep. Gregory Meeks (D-NY)
 Rep. Kendrick Meek (D-FL)
 Rep. Anthony Weiner (D-NY)
 Rep. Yvette Clarke (D-NY)
 Rep. Dennis Cardoza (D-CA)
 Rep. Corrine Brown (D-FL)
 Rep. Tim Bishop (D-NY)
 Rep. Marion Barry (D-AR)
 Rep. Mike Arcuri (D-NY)
 Rep. Gary Ackerman (D-NY)
 Rep. Richard Neal (D-MA)  
 Rep. Chris Carney (D-PA) 
 Rep. Heath Shuler (D-NC) 
 Rep. Stephanie Tubbs Jones (D-OH)
 Rep. Rob Andrews (D-NJ)
 Rep. Leonard Boswell (D-IA)
 Rep. Joe Baca (D-CA)
 Rep. Tammy Baldwin (D-WI)
 Rep. Shelley Berkley (D-NV)
 Fmr. Speaker of the United States House of Representatives Jim Wright (D-TX)
 Fmr. Rep. James Barcia (D-MI) 
 Fmr. Rep. Edward Beard (D-RI) 
 Fmr. Rep. Ken Bentsen (D-TX) 
 Fmr. Rep. Jack Brooks (D-TX) 
 Fmr. Rep. Kika de la Garza (D-TX) 
 Fmr. Rep. Mervyn Dymally (D-CA) 
 Fmr. Rep. Vic Fazio (D-CA) 
 Fmr. Rep. and 1984 Vice Presidential candidate Geraldine Ferraro (D-NY)
 Fmr. Rep. Floyd Flake (D-NY) 
 Fmr. Rep. Jack Hightower (D-TX) 
 Fmr. Rep. James H. Maloney (D-CT) 
 Fmr. Rep. Marjorie Margolies-Mezvinsky (D-PA) 
 Fmr. Rep. William Patman (D-TX) 
 Fmr. Rep. Marty Russo (D-IL) 
 Fmr. Rep. Ronnie Shows (D-MS) 
 Fmr. Speaker of the United States House of Representatives Tom Foley (D-WA)

Military
 Fmr. Chairman of the Joint Chiefs of Staff General Hugh Shelton
 Fmr. Supreme Allied Commander, Europe of NATO General Wesley Clark
 Fmr. Commander, International Security Assistance Force, General John R. Allen

National political figures
 Fmr. Secretary of Housing and Urban Development Henry Cisneros 
 Fmr. Democratic National Committee Chair Debra DeLee 
 Fmr. Democratic National Committee Chair Steve Grossman 
 Fmr. Democratic National Committee Chair Donald Fowler 
 Fmr. Democratic National Committee Chair Terry McAuliffe 
 Fmr. White House Chief of Staff Mack McLarty 
 Fmr. White House Chief of Staff Leon Panetta 
 Fmr. Secretary of Health and Human Services Donna Shalala 
 Fmr. Secretary of Transportation Rodney Slater 
 Fmr. Democratic National Committee Chair Robert Strauss 
 Fmr. United States Ambassador to the United Nations Andrew Young 
 Kathleen Kennedy, daughter of Robert F. Kennedy and Ethel Kennedy
 Kerry Kennedy, daughter of Robert F. Kennedy and Ethel Kennedy and a human rights activist
 Robert F. Kennedy, Jr., an environmentalist and a member of the Kennedy family

Governors
 Gov. Ted Kulongoski (D-OR)
 Gov. John Baldacci (D-ME)
 Gov. Mike Beebe (D-AR)
 Gov. Jon Corzine (D-NJ)
 Gov. Jennifer Granholm (D-MI)
 Gov. Martin O'Malley (D-MD) 
 Gov. Mike Easley (D-NC)
 Gov. David Paterson (D-NY)
 Gov. Ed Rendell (D-PA) 
 Gov. Ted Strickland (D-OH)
 Fmr. Gov. Tom Vilsack (D-IA) 
 Fmr. Gov. John Y. Brown, Jr. (D-KY) 
 Fmr. Gov. Julian Carroll (D-KY) 
 Fmr. Gov. Wendell Ford (D-KY),
 Fmr. Gov. Paul E. Patton (D-KY) 
 Fmr. Gov. and Fmr. Rep. Carlos Romero Barceló (PR) 
 Fmr. Gov. Pedro Rossello (PR) 
 Fmr. Gov. Hulett Smith (D-WV) 
 Fmr. Gov. John Waihee (D-HI) 
 Fmr. Gov. Brendan Byrne (D-NJ)

Family members of major political figures
 Fmr. Kentucky First Lady Phyllis George
 Anthony Shriver, founder of Best Buddies International and a member of the Kennedy family

Mayors
 Allentown, PA Mayor Ed Pawlowski (D-PA) 
 Boston, MA Mayor Thomas Menino (D-MA) 
 Hinton, West Virginia Mayor Cleo Mathews (D-WV) 
 Kalispell, Montana Mayor Pam Kennedy (MT) 
 Los Angeles, CA Mayor Antonio Villaraigosa (D-CA) 
 Morgantown, West Virginia Mayor Ron Justice (D-WV) 
 Oakland, CA Mayor Ron Dellums(D-CA)
 Philadelphia, PA Mayor Michael Nutter (D-PA)
 Pittsburgh, PA Mayor Luke Ravenstahl (D-PA)
 St. Louis, MO Mayor Francis G. Slay (D-MO) 
 San Francisco, CA Mayor Gavin Newsom (D-CA) 
 Williamstown, West Virginia Mayor Jean Ford (WV)

State and local officials

Kentucky
 Kentucky House Majority Leader Rocky Adkins
 Kentucky State Senator Denise Harper Angel (D-KY) 
 State Rep. Joni Jenkins (D-KY) 
 State Rep. Leslie Combs (D-KY)
 State Rep. Dottie J. Sims (D-KY)
 State Rep. Mary Lou Marzian (D-KY) 
 Kentucky House Speaker Jody Richards
 State Rep. Robin L. Webb (D-KY)

Maryland
 Maryland House of Delegates Speaker Pro Tempore Adrienne A. Jones (D-MD)
 Maryland House of Delegates member Susan C. Lee (D-MD)
 Maryland House of Delegates Deputy Majority Whip Shirley Nathan-Pulliam (D-MD)
 Maryland House of Delegates Deputy Speaker pro Tempore Carolyn J. B. Howard (D-MD)
 Maryland House of Delegates Deputy Majority Leader Shane E. Pendergrass (D-MD)

Ohio
Parma City Council President Sean P. Brennan

Oklahoma
 Secretary of State of Oklahoma Susan Savage (D-OK) 
 State Rep. Al McAffrey (D-OK) 
 State Rep. Scott Bighorse (D-OK) 
Fmr. President Pro Tem of Oklahoma Senate and Fmr. Mayor of Tulsa Rodger Randle (D-OK) 
 Fmr. Speaker of the Oklahoma House of Representatives Larry Adair (D-OK) 
 Fmr. Speaker of the Oklahoma House of Representatives Steve Lewis (D-OK)

West Virginia
 West Virginia House of Delegates member Bonnie Brown (D-WV) 
 House of Delegates member Richard Browning (D-WV)
 State Senate Majority Leader H. Truman Chafin (D-WV)
 House of Delegates member Barbara Evans Fleischauer (D-WV)
 House of Delegates member Barbara Hatfield (D-WV)
 House of Delegates member Linda Longstreth (D-WV)
 House of Delegates member Steve Kominar (D-WV)
 House of Delegates member Tim Miley (D-WV)
 State Senator Michael Oliverio (D-WV)
 House of Delegates member Dan Poling (D-WV)
 House of Delegates member Roman Prezioso (D-WV)
 Fmr. Speaker Pro Tempore of the West Virginia House of Delegates Phyllis Rutledge (D-WV)
 House of Delegates member Bob Tabb (D-WV)

Newspapers

Writers
 Poet Maya Angelou
 Writer Susan Estrich
 Writer Erica Jong
 Novelist Anne Rice
 Historian Sean Wilentz

Labor unions

 New York's Civil Service Employees Association, Local 1000 AFSCME

Political groups
 Houston Area Stonewall Democrats
 National Organization for Women
 Stonewall Democratic Club of New York City

Entertainers
 Actor Sean Astin
 Actor Chevy Chase
 Actor Billy Crystal
 Talk show host Ellen DeGeneres
 Actor Michael Douglas
 Actress Melanie Griffith
 Musician Sir Elton John
 Actor Jack Nicholson
 Actress Eva Longoria
 Actress Candice Bergen
 Actress Lynda Carter
 Actress Eileen Davidson
 Actress America Ferrera
 Actress Tina Fey
 Actress Sally Field
 Actress Whoopi Goldberg
 Actress Christine Lahti
 Actress and comedian Caroline Rhea
 Actress Victoria Rowell
 Actress Amber Tamblyn
 Actress Elizabeth Taylor
 Actress Reese Witherspoon
 Film director Rob Reiner
 Film director Steven Spielberg
 Film producer Bruce Cohen
 Model Marla Maples
 Musician Elvis Costello
 Musician Kenny "Babyface" Edmonds
 Talk show host and Fmr. Cincinnati Mayor Jerry Springer (D-OH)
 Musician Merle Haggard
 Musician Sophie B. Hawkins
 Musician Janet Jackson
 Musician Madonna
 Musician Barry Manilow
 Musician Christina Aguilera
 Musician and American Idol finalist Katharine McPhee
 Musician Barbra Streisand
 Musician Carly Simon
 Musician Tony Bennett
 Musician Willie Colón
 Musician Cher

Adult entertainment
Pornographic actress Jenna Jameson
Gay pornographic actor Tiger Tyson
Playboy magazine founder Hugh Hefner

Individuals
 Paris Hilton, socialite and media personality
 Donald Trump, businessman and television personality
 Kari Ann Peniche, reality television personality
 Martha Stewart, businesswoman and media personality
 Tom Steyer, businessman and hedge fund manager

Athletes
 Tennis player Billie Jean King
 Indy car driver Sarah Fisher
Basketball legend Magic Johnson.
 Baseball legend Hank Aaron

State officials
 Attorney General Andrew Cuomo (D-NY)
 Fmr. Lt. Governor Kathleen Kennedy Townsend (D-MD)

Foreign political leaders
 Mona Sahlin, leader of the Social Democratic Party of Sweden.

See also
 Congressional endorsements for the 2008 United States presidential election
 Newspaper endorsements in the United States presidential primaries, 2008
 List of Barack Obama presidential campaign endorsements, 2008
 List of John McCain presidential campaign endorsements
 List of Hillary Clinton presidential campaign political endorsements, 2016
 List of Hillary Clinton presidential campaign non-political endorsements, 2016

References

External links
 Endorsements list, in date order, from the Clinton campaign website

endorsements
Clinton, Hillary
Clinton presidential campaign endorsements
2008 United States presidential election endorsements